"Candle" is a single by Canadian country music artist Jason McCoy. Released in 1995, it was the sixth single from his album Jason McCoy. The song reached #1 on the RPM Country Tracks chart in March 1996.

Content
McCoy said that he wrote the song for his sister who was a single parent early in her life.

Chart performance

Year-end charts

References

1995 songs
1995 singles
Jason McCoy songs
Songs written by Jason McCoy
MCA Records singles